Guy Dutau FRPSL is a French philatelist who was appointed to the Roll of Distinguished Philatelists in 2019. He is a specialist in the postal history of disinfected mail.

Selected publications
La vie quotidienne dans les lazarets (2005) (with Michèle Chauvet)
La désinfection du courrier en France et dans les pays occupés (2017)

References

French philatelists
Living people
Signatories to the Roll of Distinguished Philatelists
Philatelic authors
Year of birth missing (living people)
Fellows of the Royal Philatelic Society London